Theofanis, often shortened to Fanis is a masculine given name of Greek origin that may refer to:

Fanis Christodoulou (born 1965), Greek basketball player
Theofanis Gekas (born 1980), Greek footballer
Fanis Katergiannakis, Born (1974), Greek football goalkeeper
Fanis Koumpouras (born 1983), Greek basketball player
Theofanis Michaelas (born 1991), Cypriot middle-distance runner
Fanis Mouratidis, Greek actor
Theofanis Tombras (1932–1996), Greek army officer and communications public servant
Fanis Toutziaris (born 1963), Greek footballer
Fanis Tzandaris (born 1993), Greek footballer
Fanis Katsanevakis (born 1972), Greek travel businessman

See also
Theophanes (disambiguation), historical variant of this name
Clifford Fanis, (born 1979), former West Indian cricketer
Éric Fanis (born 1971), Saint Lucian footballer

Greek masculine given names
Theophoric names